The 3rd Lahore Divisional Area was an infantry division of the British Indian Army that formed part of the Indian Army during the First World War.  It was formed in September 1914 to replace the original 3rd (Lahore) Division that had been mobilized in August 1914 for service on the Western Front.  It was abolished in May 1917 when its remaining responsibilities were passed on to the 16th Indian Division.

History
At the outbreak of the First World War, the 3rd (Lahore) Division was mobilized in August 1914 and sailed from Bombay and Karachi between 24 and 29 September for the Western Front.  The 3rd Lahore Divisional Area was formed in September 1914 to take over the area responsibilities of the 3rd (Lahore) Division.  It took over the units left behind by the original division and started to form brigades to control them: the Ambala Brigade in November and the 44th (Ferozepore) Brigade in December 1914.  However, the 45th (Jullundur) Brigade was not reformed until February 1917.  The division served under Northern Army.

It was intended to form a reserve division for the North West Frontier, but the urgent need to find troops for Mesopotamia meant that the 16th Indian Division was not formed until December 1916.  In February 1917, 44th (Ferozepore) Brigade joined 43rd Indian Brigade in the new division.  The Divisional Area and 16th Indian Division existed side by side until May 1917 when the 16th Indian Division took over the last of the area responsibilities and the 3rd Lahore Divisional Area was abolished.

Order of battle
The division commanded the following brigades in the First World War:
 Ambala Brigadeformed in November 1914; to 16th Indian Division in May 1917
 44th (Ferozepore) Brigadeformed in December 1914; to 16th Indian Division in February 1917
 45th (Jullundur) Brigadeformed in February 1917; to 16th Indian Division in May 1917

Commanders
The 3rd Lahore Divisional Area had the following commanders:

See also

 3rd (Lahore) Division for the original division
 List of Indian divisions in World War I

Notes

References

Bibliography

External links

British Indian Army divisions
Indian World War I divisions
Military units and formations established in 1914
Military units and formations disestablished in 1917